The spotless smooth-hound (Mustelus griseus) is a species of houndshark, in the family Triakidae, found on the continental shelves of the northwest Pacific, between latitudes 40° N and 11° N, from the surface to a depth of 300 m.

Description
The head is short with a fairly long, bluntly pointed snout and the body is slender. The eyes are small and close together. The mouth is long and the lower lip groove is usually longer than the upper one. The teeth are molar-like with low cusps. Both the dorsal fins have a curved trailing edge and the distance separating them occupies about 20% of the total length of the fish. The dorsal surface and flanks are grey or greyish-brown and the ventral surface is paler. The colour is uniform and there are no spots or bands of darker or lighter colour.

Distribution and habitat
The spotless smooth-hound is found in the temperate and tropical Pacific Ocean between 40°N and 11°N, off the coast of Vietnam, Japan, China and Taiwan, and possibly the Philippines. It is found near the seabed, often over sandy substrates and is thought to feed on crustaceans and other benthic invertebrates.

Biology
The spotless smooth-hound is viviparous. Litter size varies between about five and sixteen pups which are nourished by yolk sac placentas. Maximum recorded age is nine years.

Status
The spotless smooth-hound is used for human consumption of its flesh and fins which are much esteemed. It is caught using gillnets, trawls and longline fishing, either as bycatch or as a targeted species. It is not known whether the level of fishing is sustainable or whether the population is in decline. The IUCN has listed its conservation status of this shark as being "endangered" and considers that further survey work needs to be done to assess population trends and catch sizes.

References

spotless smooth-hound
Marine fauna of East Asia
spotless smooth-hound
Taxa named by Viktor Pietschmann

ru:Американская кунья акула